Asko Jussila (born 25 January 1963) is a Finnish football manager.

References

1963 births
Living people
Finnish football managers
People from Hämeenlinna
Sportspeople from Kanta-Häme